The Indian pipistrelle (Pipistrellus coromandra) is a species of bat in the family Vespertilionidae found in Afghanistan, Bangladesh, Bhutan, Cambodia, India, Myanmar, Nepal, Pakistan, Sri Lanka, Thailand, and Vietnam.

References

Pipistrellus
Taxa named by John Edward Gray
Mammals described in 1838
Bats of South Asia
Bats of Southeast Asia
Bats of India
Mammals of Afghanistan
Mammals of Pakistan
Mammals of Nepal
Mammals of Bhutan
Mammals of Sri Lanka
Mammals of Bangladesh
Taxonomy articles created by Polbot